Space pirates are a type of stock character from space opera and soft science fiction. The archetype evolved from the air pirate trope popular from the turn of the century until the 1920s. By the 1930s, space pirates were recurring villains in the Buck Rogers comic strip. Like historical sea pirates, space pirates may be involved in slaving or smuggling in addition to raiding spacecraft and settlements.

The names are organized alphabetically by surname, or by single name if the character does not have a surname. If more than two characters are in one entry, the last name of the first character is used.

Animation

Comics and manga

Film

Literature

Live-action television

Music

Video games

See also
 List of fictional pirates
 Outlaw (stock character)
 Space Cowboy (disambiguation)
 Space marine
 Space Western
 The Five Gold Bands
 Pirates in popular culture
 List of pirate films

Notes

References

External links
 Five Books About Running Away to Join a Space Pirate Crew on Tor.com
 Harlock: Space Pirate: Venice Review in The Hollywood Reporter
 Space Pirate Captain Harlock review in Den of Geek
 Vita Ayala 'reboots' Nebula, everyone's favorite space pirate in SYFY

Lists of stock characters
Space pirates
Space pirates
Fictional pirates
Lists of science fiction characters
Fictional women soldiers and warriors
Lists of fictional females